Dennis S. Charney is an American biological psychiatrist and researcher, with expertise in the neurobiology and treatment of mood and anxiety disorders. He is the author of Neurobiology of Mental Illness, The Physician's Guide to Depression and Bipolar Disorders and Molecular Biology for the Clinician, as well as the author of over 600 original papers and chapters. In 2022, he was listed #52 on Research.com's "Top Medicine Scientists in the United States," with an h-index of 194 with 146,109 citations across 651 publications. Charney is known for demonstrating that ketamine is effective for treating depression. Ketamine's use as a rapidly-acting anti-depressant is recognized as a breakthrough treatment in mental illness.

He is a professor of psychiatry, professor of neuroscience and professor of pharmacology and systems therapeutics at Icahn School of Medicine at Mount Sinai in New York City. 

In 2007, he became the Dean of the School and Executive Vice President for Academic Affairs of what was then known as the Mount Sinai Medical Center. In 2013, he was named President of Academic Affairs for the Mount Sinai Health System and as of 2022 still holds these roles. 

With Steven Southwick, MD, Professor of Psychiatry at Yale University, Charney authored Resilience: The Science of Mastering Life’s Greatest Challenges, which reflects on the science of resilience and identifies ten factors that contribute to highly reliant people. With Eric J. Nestler, MD, he is author of Charney & Nestler's Neurobiology of Mental Illness, which went into its fifth edition in 2018.

Biography

Education and career 
Charney graduated from medical school at Penn State in 1977 and completed his residency in Psychiatry at Yale School of Medicine. A fellowship in Biological Psychiatry was completed at the Connecticut Medical Health Center.

Charney became the dean of research at Mount Sinai School of Medicine in 2004, later becoming the dean for academic and scientific affairs, then succeeding Kenneth L. Davis as dean of the Icahn School of Medicine at Mount Sinai in 2007. He was elected to the Institute of Medicine in 2000.

Charney led the Mood and Anxiety Research Program at the National Institute of Mental Health, and earlier was on the faculty in the department of psychiatry at Yale Medical School.

Research 
Based on publications, Charney's research focuses on ketamine, psychiatry, major depressive disorder, clinical psychology, and anesthesia.

Ketamine treatment development 
Neuron published that Charney's neurobiological insights into ketamine are a novel approach to the underlying operation of mechanism-of-action for rapid-acting antidepressant efficacy and mood disorders and is the first model of a rapid-acting antidepressant with efficacy for treatment-resistant symptoms of mood disorders. His intranasal ketamine treatment was approved by the FDA in 2019 and now produced under the brand name Spravato. Scientific American published in 2018 that the development is the first new form of antidepressant since the 1950s.

General 
General psychiatry research includes work on anxiety, mood and psychopathology linked to work in injury prevention, thereby connecting myriad disciplines of study. Research into depression shows elements of internal medicine and management. Clinical psychology includes psychological intervention and resilience. Anesthesia research shows themes of randomized controlled trials and Esketamine. Traumatic stress is part of his psychology study and is frequently connected to suicide prevention, bridging the gap between various science disciplines and establishing new relationships. Other areas of study are bipolar disorder, endocrinology and oncology. The endocrinology research is multidisciplinary, relying on the orbitofrontal cortex and serotonin.

Patents 
Charney owns patents in dopamine and noradrenergic reuptake inhibitors in the treatment of schizophrenia and in intranasal administration of ketamine to treat depression. In total, as of 2022, he holds five issued patents and six pending.

Affiliations and positions 

Principal investigator, VA National Center for Post-traumatic Stress Disorder and the NIMH Yale Mental Health Clinical Research Center.
Member, Food and Drug Administration Psychopharmacologic Drug Advisory Committee
Editorial committee, Biological Psychiatry, a publication of the Society of Biological Psychiatry
Former chair, Board of Scientific Counselors for the National Institute of Mental Health
Former chair, scientific advisory board of the Anxiety Disorders Association of America (ADAA)
Former chair, Depression and Bipolar Support Alliance (DBSA) Scientific Advisory Board
Past president, American College of Neuropsychopharmacology
Member, Scientific Advisory Board of the National Alliance for Research on Schizophrenia and Depression (NARSAD, now known as the Brain & Behavior Research Foundation)
Member, National Alliance for the Mentally Ill (NAMI)
Former scientific director, NIMH Strategic Plan for Mood Disorder Research in 2002.

Awards and honors 
Partial list: 
2019 Colvin Prize for Outstanding Achievement in Mood Disorders Research
2017 Ketamine for Treatment-Resistant Depression – Named One of Top 10 on 2017 Health Care Innovations List 
2017 American Heart Association Heart of Gold Award 
2017 - Fellow, National Academy of Inventors
2015 The World's Most Influential Minds
2014 Distinguished Alumni Award from the Pennsylvania State University School of Medicine 
2014 The World's Most Influential Scientific Minds
2009 ACNP Julius Axelrod Mentorship Award 
2006 The Gold Medal Award from the Society of Biological Psychiatry2004 Research and Mood Disorders – American College of Psychiatrists
2004 CINP-Lilly Neuroscience Clinical Research Award
2004 The American Psychiatric Association Award for Research 
2000 Election, National Academy of Medicine
1999 The American College of Psychiatrists Award for Depression Research
1999 The Edward J. Sacher Award from Columbia University
1999 The Gerald L. Klerman Lifetime Achievement Award from the Depression and Bipolar Support Alliance (DBSA)
1994–1995 Anna Monika Foundation Award for Research in Affective Disorders 
1992 Daniel H. Efron Research Award from the American College of Neuropsychopharmacology
2014–2015 Distinguished Alumni Award, Pennsylvania State University

Personal life 
Charney is the father of five children and grandfather of eight. On the morning of August 29, 2016, Charney was shot and wounded by Hengjun Chao, as Charney left Lange's Deli in Charney's hometown of Chappaqua, New York. Chao was a former Mount Sinai medical researcher who had been fired by Charney in 2010 for research fraud. Chao's trial began on June 5, 2017, and eight days later Chao was convicted of attempted second-degree murder and two other charges in Westchester County Court in White Plains. He was sentenced to 28 years in prison. These personal events contributed first-hand to his study of resilience and are discussed in this his book "Resilience".

Litigation 
In April 2019, a lawsuit was filed against Dr. Charney, several other defendants, and the Mount Sinai Health System for sex and age discrimination at the Arnhold Institute for Global Health at the Icahn School of Medicine. The suit was filed by eight current and former employees, all but one women.

Books and publications 
He has been named among the top 3 most highly cited authors of psychiatric research in the decade ending in 2000 by the Institute for Scientific Information. He has been on the editorial board of 15 journals, including Biological Psychiatry, Journal of Anxiety Disorders, Journal of Affective Disorders, Acta Psychiatrica Scandinavia, Journal of Psychopharmacology, Human Psychopharmacology, and Psychopharmacology Bulletin.

Books
2018 Charney DS, Nestler EJ, Charney & Nestler's Neurobiology of Mental Illness, Oxford University Press; Fifth Edition, 
2018 Charney DS, Southwick SM, Resilience: The Science of Mastering Life’s Greatest Challenges,  Cambridge University Press, Second Edition, 
2013 Charney DS, Nestler EJ, Buxbaum JD, Sklar Pamela (eds). Neurobiology of Mental Illness, New York, NY, Oxford University Press, Fourth Edition 
2011 Southwick SM, Litz BT, Charney DS, Friedman MJ Resilience and Mental Health: Challenges Across the Lifespan, Cambridge University Press 
2012 Charney DS, Southwick SM Resilience: The Science of Mastering Life's Greatest Challenges, Cambridge University Press 
2009 Stress-induced and Fear Circuitry Disorders: Refining the Research Agenda for Dsm-v by Gavin Andrews, Dennis S. Charney, Paul J. Sirovatka, Darrel A. Regier, American Psychiatric Publishing, 
2006 The Physician's Guide to Depression & Bipolar Disorders by Dennis S. Charney, Lydia Lewis, McGraw-Hill,  (0-07-144175-1)
2003 Molecular Biology for the Clinician, by Dennis S. Charney, American Psychiatric Press, 
2002 Pediatric Psychoparmacology: Principles and Practice by James F. Leckman, Dennis S. Charney, Lawrence Scahill, Andres Martin, Oxford Univ Pr,  (0-19-514173-3)
2002 Neuropsychopharmacology: The Fifth Generation of Progress by American College of Neuropsychopharmacology and Joseph T. Coyle and Charles Nemeroff and Dennis Charney and Kenneth L. Davis, Hardcover, Lippincott Williams & Wilkins,  (0-7817-2837-1)
1999 Neurobiology of Mental Illness by Eric J. Nestler, Dennis S. Charney, Oxford Press,  (0-19-518980-9)
1995 Neurobiological and Clinical Consequences of Stress: From Normal Adaptation to Post-Traumatic Stress Disorder by Matthew J. Friedman, Dennis S. Charney, Ariel Y. Deutch, Lippincott Williams & Wilkins,  (0-7817-0177-5)

Publications
Charney's most cited publications are:

 Goodman WK, Price LH, Rasmussen SA, et al. The Yale-Brown Obsessive Compulsive Scale: I. Development, Use, and Reliability. Arch Gen Psychiatry. 1989;46(11):1006–1011. doi:10.1001/archpsyc.1989.01810110048007  (8092 citations)
 Blake DD, Weathers FW, Nagy LM, Kaloupek DG, Gusman FD, Charney DS, Keane TM. The development of a Clinician-Administered PTSD Scale. J Trauma Stress. 1995 Jan;8(1):75-90. doi: 10.1007/BF02105408. . (5703 citations)
 Krystal JH, Karper LP, Seibyl JP, Freeman GK, Delaney R, Bremner JD, Heninger GR, Bowers MB Jr, Charney DS. Subanesthetic effects of the noncompetitive NMDA antagonist, ketamine, in humans. Psychotomimetic, perceptual, cognitive, and neuroendocrine responses. Arch Gen Psychiatry. 1994 Mar;51(3):199-214. doi: 10.1001/archpsyc.1994.03950030035004. . (3505  citations)

Other notable articles:

 Berman RM, Cappiello A, Anand A, Oren DA, Heninger GR, Charney DS, Krystal JH: Antidepressant Effects of Ketamine in Depressed Patients. Biological Psychiatry, 2000; 47:351-354.
 Charney DS: Psychobiological Mechanisms of resilience and vulnerability: Implications for the successful adaptation to extreme stress. Am J Psychiatry, 2004; 161:195-216.
 Zarate CA Jr, Singh JB, Quiroz JA, De Jesus G, Denicoff KK, Luckenbaugh DA, Manji HK, Charney DS A double-blind, placebo-controlled study of memantine in the treatment of major depression. Am J Psychiatry. 2006; 163(1):153-5.
 Murrough JW, Iosifescu DV, Chang LC, Al Jurdi RK, Green CE, Perez AM, Iqbal S, Pillemer S, Foulkes A, Shah A, Charney DS, Mathew SJ. Antidepressant efficacy of ketamine in treatment-resistant major depression: a two-site randomized controlled trial. Am J Psychiatry. 2013 Oct 1;170(10):1134-42.
 Feder A, Parides MK, Murrough JW, Perez AM, Morgan JE, Saxena S, Kirkwood K, Aan Het Rot M, Lapidus KA, Wan LB, Iosifescu D, Charney DS. Efficacy of Intravenous Ketamine for Treatment of Chronic Posttraumatic Stress Disorder: A Randomized Clinical Trial. JAMA Psychiatry. 2014 Jun;71(6):681-8.
 Iacoviello BM, Wu G, Alvarez E, Huryk K, Collins KA, Murrough JW, Iosifescu DV, Charney DS. Cognitive-Emotional Training as an Intervention for Major Depressive Disorder. Depress Anxiety. 2014 Aug;31(8):699-706.
 Feder A, Fred-Torres S, Southwick SM, Charney DS. The Biology of Human Resilience: Opportunities for Enhancing Resilience Across the Life Span. Biol Psychiatry. 2019 Sep 15;86(6):443-453.
 Krystal JH, Charney DS, Duman RS. A New Rapid-Acting Antidepressant. Cell. 2020 Apr 2;181(1):7.
 Charney AW, Katz C, Southwick SM, Charney DS. A Call to Protect the Health Care Workers Fighting COVID-19 in the United States. Am J Psychiatry. 2020 Jul 31.
 Feder A, Costi S, Rutter SB, Collins AB, Govindarajulu U, Jha MK, Horn SR, Kautz M, Corniquel M, Collins KA, Bevilacqua L, Glasgow AM, Brallier J, Pietrzak RH, Murrough JW, Charney DS. A Randomized Controlled Trial of Repeated Ketamine Administration for Chronic Posttraumatic Stress Disorder. Am J Psychiatry. 2021 Feb 1;178(2).

References

External links
Mount Sinai Hospital homepage
Icahn School of Medicine at Mount Sinai homepage
Dean's Office, Icahn School of Medicine at Mount Sinai
Biological Psychiatry: A Journal of Psychiatric Neuroscience and Therapeutics
Video: Demons of Mind: Neuroscience and Other Weapons, Library of Congress
Video: Coping with Anxiety and Depression in Uncertain Times, National Library of Medicine

American medical academics
American medical researchers
American psychiatrists
American textbook writers
Bipolar disorder researchers
Living people
Members of the National Academy of Medicine
Icahn School of Medicine at Mount Sinai faculty
Penn State College of Medicine alumni
Yale School of Medicine alumni
Year of birth missing (living people)
Antidepressants